The Sri Lanka national cricket team toured Australia in the 1989-90 season and played 2 Test matches against Australia.  Australia won the series 1-0 with one match drawn.

Test series summary

First Test

Second Test

External sources
 CricketArchive

References
 Playfair Cricket Annual (annual)
 Wisden Cricketers Almanack (annual)

1989 in Australian cricket
1989 in Sri Lankan cricket
1989–90 Australian cricket season
1990 in Australian cricket
1990 in Sri Lankan cricket
International cricket competitions from 1988–89 to 1991
1989-90